José Ortega Torres (born 1943) is a poet born in Granada, Spain; he is a known author in the Andalusian poetic scene. A contemporary of the Novísimos poetic movement, his work follows more traditional forms (rhyme, sonnet), with a marked rhythm and deliberate word choice that bring to mind the classical Mediterranean tradition
His biography sheds light on the local history of poetry in the city of Granada.

Biography
José Ortega Torres majored in Romance Philology at the University of Granada between 1966 and 1969 and in 1971 read his dissertation "Aproximación a la poesía de Rafael Guillén" (Approach to the poetry of Rafael Guillén), under the supervision of Professor Emilio Orozco Díaz. In 1975 he founded with poets José Lupiáñez (La Línea de la Concepción) and José Gutiérrez (Granada) the Silene literary collection, which since then has published works by many local poets (among others, Juan de Loxa, José Rienda, Elena Martín Vivaldi and Carmelo Sánchez Muros). He obtained his Ph.D. in Spanish Philology in 1971 with the work "La poesía de Rafael Guillén: lengua, temas y estilo" (Rafael Guillén's Poetry - Language, Subjects and Style).

During the 1990s and 2000s he taught Spanish Literature at the Faculty of Translation and Interpreting of the University of Granada.

José Ortega Torres uses the anagram Narzeo Antino.

Quotes

'Diamante', Granada, 1978, p. 34.

Works and Prizes

 Cauce vivo ("A Live Riverbed"), 1971, signed as Aldo Fresno
 Ceremonia salvaje ("A Wild Ceremony"), 1973
 Carmen de Aynadamar ("The Carmen of Aynadamar"), 1974
 Ritos y cenizas ("Rites and Ashes"), 1975
 "Poema de la Alhambra, de A.E.” (published in the Granada journal Ideal on February 23, 1975)
 El exilio y el reino ("The Exile and the Kingdom"), 1979
 Hierofanía ("Hierophany", 1981), Federico García Lorca Prize in 1979 (sponsored by the University of Granada).
 La diadema y el cetro: himno ("The Diadem and the Sceptre - a Hymn"), 1983
 Diamante: (espacio íntimo) (Diamond: an intimate space"), 1987
 Olvido es el mar, ("The Sea is Oblivion"), 1989
 Domus aurea ("Domus Aurea", 1996), Provincia de León Prize, 1994.
 Laurel & glosa, ("A Laurel and a Note"), 1997
 Centinela del aire ("The Sentinel of the Air"), 1999, Ciudad de Salamanca Prize.
 Amante desafío ("A Loving Challenge"), 2001
 Fulgor de la materia ("The Splendor of the Matter"), 2003
 Un título para Eros. Erotismo, sensualidad y sexualidad en la literatura ("A Title for Eros. Erotism, Sensuality and Sexuality in Literature"), Chapter 7 - “Falomanía y travesura en El jardín de Venus de Samaniego” ("Fallomania and Play in Samaniego's Garden of Venus")

References

External links
 Editorial Dauro site - Reference to the author's work and prizes
 Site of the Granada journal Ideal - Article on the poet José Ortega Torres, published on 2006-04-01

Living people
People from Granada
20th-century Spanish poets
1943 births
Spanish male poets
20th-century Spanish male writers